Adelia María is a locality located in the Río Cuarto Department in the Province of Córdoba in central Argentina.

The main source of income is agriculture. There are also plants for the collection of cereals, a flour mill and a Rural Extension Agency of the INTA (National Institute of Agricultural Technology).

References

Populated places in Córdoba Province, Argentina